David Edward Satterfield Jr. (September 11, 1894 – December 27, 1946) was a U.S. Representative from Virginia's 3rd congressional district.  He took office on November 2, 1937 after a special election to fill the vacancy created by the death of Andrew J. Montague and was re-elected four additional times before resigning on February 15, 1945 to become the executive director of the Life Insurance Association of America.  His son, David E. Satterfield III, later served in the House for 16 years, representing the same district that his father had.

Biography
Satterfield attended Richmond College at the University of Richmond, where he was a three-year starter on the basketball team from 1913 to 1916.  After graduation, he served as the head coach for the Spiders basketball team in 1917–1918, compiling a record of 3–6.

Head coaching record

Electoral history

1937; Satterfield was elected to the U.S. House of Representatives unopposed.
1938; Satterfield was re-elected unopposed.
1940; Satterfield was re-elected with 96.87% of the vote, defeating Socialist Winston Dawson.
1942; Satterfield was re-elected unopposed.
1944; Satterfield was re-elected unopposed.

External links
Entry in Biographical Directory of the United States Congress

1894 births
1946 deaths
Politicians from Richmond, Virginia
Richmond Spiders men's basketball coaches
Richmond Spiders men's basketball players
Democratic Party members of the United States House of Representatives from Virginia
20th-century American politicians
American men's basketball players